Henryk may refer to:
 Henryk (given name)
 Henryk, Świętokrzyskie Voivodeship, a village in south-central Poland
 Henryk Glacier, an Antarctic glacier

See also
 Henryk Batuta hoax, an internet hoax
 Henrykian articles, a Polish constitutional law establishing elective monarchy